Itki is a town in Djibouti.

Itki may also refer to:
Itki block, an administrative division in Ranchi district, Jharkhand, India
Itki, India, a village in Ranchi district, Jharkhand, India